Predeal is a town in Brașov County, Transylvania, Romania. Predeal, a mountain resort town, is the highest town in Romania.

The town administers three villages: Pârâul Rece, Timișu de Jos and Timișu de Sus. Predeal is twinned with Macugnaga, Italy.

Beginning in the 2000s, the area experienced a boom in construction, and now many wealthy families own mountain retreats in Predeal.

During the 2013 European Youth Olympic Winter Festival, it hosted the cross-country skiing and snowboarding competitions.

Name

The name Predeal is derived from the Slavic word predel, which means "border".

History 
The town was severely damaged during the Battle of Predeal Pass in World War I. Although the town itself was lost to the attacking Central Powers' forces, the battle ultimately resulted in a Romanian defensive victory.

Geography 
Predeal is situated in the Centru development region of Romania, in the Prahova Valley, in the southern part of Brașov County. Neighboring towns include Azuga to the south, Bușteni to the southwest, Râșnov to the northwest and Brașov to the north.

The town is mountainous, with the Piatra Mare mountains to the north, the Bucegi mountains to the southwest and the Postăvarul Massif to the northwest. The woods around Predeal have a rich and diversified fauna, including a high number of wild boars, European pine martens, bears, foxes, gray wolves, deer, squirrels, rabbits, badgers and heather cocks.

Climate
Predeal has a warm-summer and cold în winter (with a lot of snow) humid continental climate (Dfb in the Köppen climate classification).

Tourism 
The town of Predeal is a well-known tourist destination in Romania, especially in winter.

Predeal has five major ski runs, each with a difficulty grade. Most of them have snowmaking guns, and some are fitted with floodlights and ski lifts.

Some of the town's tourist attractions include the 3 Brazi Chalet, The Susai Chalet and The Poiana Secuilor Chalet. In close proximity to Predeal are several tourist destinations, including the Peleş Castle, Râșnov Citadel, Bran Castle, The Old Town of Brașov, Biserica Neagră and the Seven Ladders Canyon.

The town has been certified as a climate resort by government decree (H.G. 226/1992) due to the strongly ionized air rich in ultraviolet radiation and the low atmospheric pressure. Because of this, Predeal is popular within the holistic healing community.

Infrastructure 
The town is crossed by two national roads (DN73A and DN1) and one national railway (Line 300, one of the main lines in Romania). Predeal is one of the cities which will be crossed by the future Bucharest – Brașov motorway.

Gallery

Notes

References 
 Strategia de dezvoltare a orașului Predeal

External links 

 Town map
 Pictures and landscapes from the Carpathian Mountains
 Predeal-alpine station, accommodation, sensitive map

Populated places in Brașov County
Localities in Transylvania
Towns in Romania
Prahova Valley
Ski areas and resorts in Romania
Place names of Slavic origin in Romania